Charles Stanley Dutton (born January 30, 1951) is an American retired actor and director. He is best known for his roles in the television series Roc (1991–1994) and the television film The Piano Lesson (1995), the latter of which earned him a Golden Globe Award nomination. His other accolades include three Primetime Emmy Awards and three NAACP Image Awards.

Dutton has also appeared in many feature films such as Alien 3 (1992), Rudy (1993), Menace II Society (1993), A Time to Kill (1996), Cookie's Fortune (1999), and Gothika (2003).

Early life
Dutton was born January 30, 1951, on the east side of Baltimore, Maryland. His father was a truck driver and his parents divorced when he was four. He grew up in Baltimore's Latrobe Homes public housing project. In his youth, Dutton dropped out of school before finishing middle school. He had a short-lived stint as an amateur boxer with the nickname "Roc", a nickname derived from "Rockhead", due to rock throwing battles which took place during Dutton's childhood.

In 1967, when he was 16, Dutton got into a fight that resulted in the death of a man Dutton claimed had attacked him with a knife.

Prison convictions, discovering acting, and education
After the knife fight, Dutton pleaded guilty in 1967 to manslaughter and was sentenced to five years in prison, which he began serving at the Maryland House of Correction in Jessup, Maryland. Out on parole after 18 or 20 months, he was arrested on robbery and handgun charges. He was sentenced on the handgun violation and sent to the Maryland Penitentiary, near his boyhood home, for three more years. A fight with a guard added on another eight years. In reference to this, Dutton later said, "I got three years for killing a black man and eight for punching a white man."

During his prison term, Dutton was stabbed by another prisoner and nearly died. He became interested in radical movements and the Black Panther Party.

Several months into his second prison term, Dutton was sentenced to six days of solitary confinement for refusing to clean toilets. Prisoners were allowed to take one book and, unintentionally, he grabbed an anthology of black playwrights. He enjoyed the book so much that upon release from solitary he petitioned the warden to start a drama group for the winter talent show. The warden agreed on the condition that Dutton go back to school and get his GED. Dutton accomplished that and eventually completed a two-year college program at Hagerstown Junior College (now Hagerstown Community College) in Hagerstown, Maryland, graduating with an Associate of Arts degree in 1976.

Dutton was paroled on August 20, 1976. After his release from prison, he enrolled as a drama major at Towson State University (now Towson University) in the Baltimore suburb of Towson, Maryland, where he graduated with a Bachelor of Arts degree in 1978. After his time at Towson, Dutton earned a master's degree in acting from the Yale School of Drama in 1983.

Acting career
In 1984, Dutton made his Broadway debut in August Wilson's Ma Rainey's Black Bottom, winning a Theatre World Award and a Tony Award nomination for Best Actor. In 1988, Dutton played Leroy Brown in Crocodile Dundee II and a killer in the television miniseries The Murder of Mary Phagan opposite Jack Lemmon and Kevin Spacey. In 1990, Dutton earned a second Best Actor Tony nomination for his role in another Wilson play, The Piano Lesson. Dutton co-starred in Alien 3, the debut film of director David Fincher, then co-starred in 1993's Rudy. Other films he has appeared in include Get on the Bus; A Time to Kill; Cookie's Fortune; Cry, the Beloved Country; Surviving the Game; Menace II Society; Secret Window; and A Low Down Dirty Shame.

Dutton won Outstanding Guest Actor Emmy Awards in 2002 and 2003 for his roles in The Practice and Without a Trace. He was previously nominated in 1999 for his guest-starring role as Alvah Case in the HBO prison drama Oz in its second-season premiere episode. For this role, he was also nominated for an NAACP Image Award. Also in 1999, he starred in an ensemble cast in Aftershock: Earthquake in New York in which he played the Mayor of New York City. Dutton gained acclaim for his comedy show Roc shown on FOX television (but produced by HBO) from 1991 to 1994. His work in this role won him an NAACP Image Award. He co-starred in the popular but short-lived 2005 CBS science fiction series, Threshold.

In 2000, Dutton directed the HBO miniseries The Corner. The miniseries was close to his heart, for Dutton grew up on the streets of East Baltimore. It was adapted from The Corner: A Year in the Life of an Inner-City Neighborhood (Broadway Books, 1997) by David Simon (a reporter for the Baltimore Sun) and Ed Burns (a retired Baltimore homicide detective). The Corner won several Emmys in 2000, including Best Miniseries. Dutton won for his direction of the miniseries. He worked with Simon previously in a 1996 episode of Homicide: Life on the Street.

He starred as Montgomery County, Maryland Police Chief Charles Moose in the 2003 made-for-TV movie D.C. Sniper: 23 Days of Fear, and appeared in Season 2 of The L Word. Dutton also appeared in "Another Toothpick," an episode of The Sopranos. He guest starred on House M.D. as the father of Dr Eric Foreman (Omar Epps), and on Sleeper Cell: American Terror as the father of undercover FBI agent Darwyn Al-Sayeed. He also directed two episodes of Sleeper Cell.

On October 9, 2007, HBO announced that it had arranged a deal with Dutton where he would develop, direct, and star in series and movies for the network. He also appeared in the 2007 film Honeydripper. On February 14, 2013, Dutton returned to TV in Zero Hour, playing the role of a priest. In 2013, Dutton played Detective Margolis in the horror film The Monkey's Paw.

Filmography

Television

Notes

References

External links
 
 
 
 
 Good Biography of Dutton at Answers.com

1951 births
Living people
20th-century American male actors
21st-century American male actors
African-American film directors
African-American television producers
American television producers
African-American male actors
African-American television directors
American television directors
American documentary filmmakers
American male film actors
American male television actors
American male voice actors
American people convicted of manslaughter
Drama Desk Award winners
Film directors from Maryland
Male actors from Baltimore
People from Ellicott City, Maryland
Primetime Emmy Award winners
Towson University alumni
Yale School of Drama alumni
20th-century African-American people
21st-century African-American people